In the sport of Australian rules football, the half-back line refers to the positions of the 3 players on the field that occupy the centre half-back and left and right half-back flank positions.

Centre half-back
The role of the centre half-back is similar to that of a defensive midfielder in association football. As the first line of defence, the centre half-back must aim to break down opposition attacks before they can get into a scoring position. Given that a centre half-back's opponent is usually the centre half-forward, the role is regarded as a key position in the team, and is usually reserved for tall and well-built players.

As one of the team's leaders, centre half-backs must be able to read the play and have good communication skills. Although their first responsibility is to defend, the great centre half-backs have proven to be equally creative in attack as well as reliable in defence.

Notable centre half-backs from over the years include:
 Walter "Wacka" Scott (1920–1932), Magarey Medallist 1921, 1924, 1930
 Reg Hickey (1926–1940)
 Denis Cordner (Melbourne, 1943–1956) 
 Ron Clegg (1949–1960), Brownlow medallist 1949
 Ian "Bluey" Shelton (1959–1965)
 Peter Knights (Hawthorn, 1969–1985)
 Jim Jess (1976–1988)
 Paul Roos (Fitzroy and Sydney, 1982–1998)
 Glen Jakovich (West Coast, 1991–2004)

Half-back flank
The half-back flank was traditionally a defensive position, where reliability and toughness were more important than attacking flair. In the modern game, reliability and toughness must now be combined with the ability to run and carry the ball as well as take on the opposition in a counter-attacking style.

Notable half-back flankers over the years in Australian football include:
 Alec Epis (1958–1968)
 Bruce Doull (1969–1986), Norm Smith Medallist 1981; Named Half-back flank in AFL Team of the Century (1996)
 Stephen Wallis (1983–1996)
 Guy McKenna (1988–2000)
 Andrew McKay
 Rohan Smith
 Andrew McLeod
 Nigel Smart
 Luke Hodge
 Brendon Goddard
 Corey Enright
 Shannon Hurn
 Beau Waters
 Adam Saad
 Bachar Houli
 Christian Salem

References

Bibliography

Australian rules football terminology